Yuriy Ruslanovych Hluschuk (born 16 January 1995) is a Ukrainian professional footballer who plays as a midfielder for Epitsentr Dunaivtsi.

Career
Born in Irpin, Hluschuk is a product of the FC Hart-Ros Irpin and FC Shakhtar youth sportive schools.

In July 2015, he went on loan for the Ukrainian First League club FC Illichivets Mariupol.

International career
He was called up for the Ukraine national under-21 football team by Serhiy Kovalets in January 2015, but not spent any match for this representation.

References

External links
 
 
 

1995 births
Living people
People from Irpin
Ukrainian footballers
Ukraine youth international footballers
Association football midfielders
FC Shakhtar-3 Donetsk players
FC Mariupol players
FC Shakhtar Donetsk players
FC Vorskla Poltava players
FC Kremin Kremenchuk players
FC Lokomotiv Yerevan players
FC Rubikon Kyiv players
FC Olimpik Donetsk players
FC Epitsentr Dunaivtsi players
Ukrainian Premier League players
Ukrainian First League players
Ukrainian Second League players
Ukrainian Amateur Football Championship players
Armenian First League players
IV liga players
Ukrainian expatriate footballers
Ukrainian expatriate sportspeople in Armenia
Expatriate footballers in Armenia
Expatriate footballers in Poland
Ukrainian expatriate sportspeople in Poland
Sportspeople from Kyiv Oblast